Vietnam Airlines Flight 815 was a scheduled Vietnam Airlines flight which crashed on final approach to Phnom Penh International Airport in Cambodia on 3 September 1997. The Soviet-built Tupolev Tu-134B-3 airliner crashed approximately  short of the Phnom Penh runway, killing 65 of the 66 people on board. As of 2023, it remains the deadliest accident in Cambodian History. Upon investigation, the crash was determined to have been the result of improper actions by the pilot.

Aircraft
The aircraft was manufactured on 5 October 1984, registration number VN-A120, serial number 66360.

Accident

Flight 815 departed Ho Chi Minh City around 1 o'clock in the afternoon for the 45-minute flight to Phnom Penh. The aircraft was approaching the Phnom Penh airport from the east in heavy rain. According to acting airport director and investigating committee chief Sok Sambour, the plane was supposed to be flying at  when it began its approach, but was at  when it reached the range of Pochentong's Non-Directional Beacon (NDB).

The airport previously had a VOR/DME located on station, but it had been looted the previous July. As a result, the frequency of aborted landings had increased over the rainy season. The runway lights had also been looted, but were reportedly replaced and illuminated at the time.

The control tower agreed, but requested the pilot remind the control tower often of its approach, due to the heavy weather. However, when the plane approached the airport it was at  when the pilot again asked for permission to land, stating that he could not find the runway.

After a moment the control tower inquired if the pilot had found the runway, to which the pilot replied that he could not see the runway. The control tower then informed the pilot that the wind direction was changing. The pilot was on an eastern approach to runway 23; the tower requested that the pilot instead approach runway 5 from the west. Continuing on the eastern approach would cause the pilot to attempt to land downwind. The pilot acknowledged the request, and had no further contact with the control tower.Two minutes later, Flight 815 was spotted still approaching from the east. The cockpit voice recorder (CVR) showed at that time the first officer, Hoang Van Dinh  (49), asked the captain, Pham Van Tieu (59), to pull up and abort the landing, as they still did not have visual of the runway. The captain said he would wait a little. It was too late, however; four seconds later the left wing of the plane struck a palm tree. At that time they were not in line with the runway, having veered left across the military side of the airport. Striking the tree caused one engine to stop. The right wing skimmed across a house.

Eyewitnesses state that flames began to spew out of the plane's tail after it struck the tree. One witness states he saw an emergency door open and could see passengers crowded at the door, but none jumped before the airplane struck the ground. The aircraft then slid  through several dry rice paddies before exploding at around 1:40 pm.

Victims 

Most of the passengers were from South Korea and Taiwan. The 22 Taiwanese nationals were mainly coming for business reasons, though two or three were travelling to Cambodia for their weddings. Six of the 21 South Koreans were a medical team donating equipment to Phnom Penh University.

Five people were still alive after the crash and were taken to the hospital. Initially two survived; Chanayuth Nim-anong, a 14-month-old boy from Thailand who sustained broken legs, and a four-year-old Vietnamese boy who received head injuries. Nim-anong was the sole survivor after the Vietnamese boy succumbed to his injuries. The plane skimmed the top of a house and damaged it before landing on an oxcart road. One wing decapitated two cows. Initial looting of the scene was done by military and police. Once the bodies were removed, villagers looted much of the remaining personal belongings and parts of the aircraft including the flight recorders.

Investigation
Cambodia's government offered a reward for the return of the missing flight recorders. The three flight recorders, the CVR, the flight data recorder (FDR), and the quick access recorder (QAR), were all obtained from the villagers for US$10, $200, and $1500, respectively.

Initially Vietnam Airlines and Phnom Penh airport workers argued over who was at fault. The airline stated that the navigational equipment at Phnom Penh airport was out of order and its control tower gave the pilots incorrect information prior to takeoff.
However, the report by Cambodia's Aircraft Accident Investigation Committee determined that the cause of the crash was pilot error. The report concluded that the principal factors were:
 the captain did not follow the instructions of the approach controller in the control tower and he made the decision to continue to descend in very bad weather
 the captain ignored the advice of his first officer and flight engineer 
 the captain's insistence in engaging the auto pilot even after passing the minimum height at which one should decide whether or not to land
 the captain's impulsive actions to continue his approach in the conditions revealed "his psychological unreadiness to abort the landing and go around"

When the aircraft hit the trees, the captain finally realized the runway was not in sight and tried to abort the approach; the flight engineer pushed for full power, but the aircraft lost control and veered right; the right engine then failed, making it impossible to gain lift. The aircraft subsequently stalled and crashed.

Examinations of the aircraft and records determined that there was no mechanical problem and all maintenance was up to date. The crew all had valid licenses and medical certificates.

References

External links

1997 in Vietnam
Aviation accidents and incidents in 1997
Aviation accidents and incidents in Cambodia
Accidents and incidents involving the Tupolev Tu-134
Phnom Penh
1997 in Cambodia
September 1997 events in Asia
Airliner accidents and incidents caused by weather
Airliner accidents and incidents caused by pilot error
1997 meteorology
Vietnam Airlines accidents and incidents